During the 2001–02 English football season, Rotherham United F.C. competed in the Football League First Division.

Season summary
In Rotherham's first season in the second tier of English football since 1983, it was a huge struggle for  manager Ronnie Moore as the team started the season poorly by failing to win any of their opening 10 league games which saw them bottom with only four points and seemed destined for a return to the Second Division but from the start of October went on a decent run by picking up 15 points from the next eight league games which saw them climb out of the relegation zone and kept themselves away from the drop for rest of the season despite failing to win any of their final 10 league matches.

Final league table

Results
Rotherham United's score comes first

Legend

Football League First Division

FA Cup

League Cup

Players

First-team squad
Squad at end of season

Left club during season

References

Rotherham United F.C. seasons
Rotherham United